Calycomyza frickiana is a species of leaf miner fly in the family Agromyzidae.

References

Agromyzidae
Articles created by Qbugbot
Insects described in 1986